Robert Edward John Baxter  (born 10 March 1971) is the Director of Rugby of English Premiership rugby team Exeter Chiefs. He previously played for the club for 14 years, 10 of them as captain. Baxter has also both captained and coached the Barbarians.

Playing career
As a player Baxter played lock for Exeter for 14 years and served as the club's captain for 10 years.

Coaching career
Following his retirement he moved into coaching the University of Exeter side while acting as a forwards coach for the Chiefs. Rob Baxter was appointed to the position of acting coach head coach of Exeter Chiefs following the sacking of former coach Pete Drewett in March 2009. On 7 May 2009 it was announced that Baxter will be taking over the position of Head Coach of the Exeter Chiefs. In Baxter's first season as coach, he led the team to promotion from the RFU Championship to the Premiership. Baxter's efforts in establishing Exeter as a strong Premiership side were recognised when he won the 2011/12 Director of the Year award at the Aviva Premiership awards, having also been nominated for the honour the previous season.

It was announced on 26 March 2013 that Baxter would join the England coaching team for the summer tour to Argentina and Uruguay.

In the 2016/2017 season, Baxter led the Exeter Chiefs to win the English Premiership for the first time in their history by beating Wasps in the final 23-20.

In the 2019/2020 season, Baxter led the Exeter Chiefs to win the European Rugby Champions Cup for the first time, beating Racing 92 at Ashton Gate, Bristol in the final 31-27. Just one week later, he led the Chiefs to victory in the English Premiership for a second time, beating Wasps again at Twickenham in the final 19-13, and secured a historic English and European Cup double for Exeter Chiefs.

Baxter was appointed Officer of the Order of the British Empire (OBE) in the 2021 New Year Honours for services to rugby union.

Personal life
Baxter is married to Jo and has two children. They live in Exeter, Devon.

References

External links
 Exeter profile
 Exeter press release - 200 appearances

1971 births
Living people
Barbarian F.C. players
English rugby union coaches
English rugby union players
Exeter Chiefs players
Officers of the Order of the British Empire
Rugby union players from Tavistock